Metastatic calcification is deposition of calcium salts in otherwise normal tissue, because of elevated serum levels of calcium, which can occur because of deranged metabolism as well as increased absorption or decreased excretion of calcium and related minerals, as seen in hyperparathyroidism.

In contrast, dystrophic calcification is caused by abnormalities or degeneration of tissues resulting in mineral deposition, though blood levels of calcium remain normal. These differences in pathology also mean that metastatic calcification is often found in many tissues throughout a person or animal, whereas dystrophic calcification is localized. 

Metastatic calcification can occur widely throughout the body but principally affects the interstitial tissues of the vasculature, kidneys, lungs, and gastric mucosa. For the latter three, acid secretions or rapid changes in pH levels contribute to the formation of salts.

Causes
Hypercalcemia, elevated blood calcium, has numerous causes, including

 Elevated levels of parathyroid hormone due to hyperparathyroidism, leading to bone resorption and subsequent hypercalcemia by reducing phosphate concentration.
 Secretion of parathyroid hormone-related protein by certain tumors.
 Resorption of bone due to
 Primary bone marrow tumors (e.g. multiple myeloma and leukemia)
 Metastasis of other tumors, breast cancer for example, to bone.
 Paget disease
 Immobilization
 Vitamin D related disorders
 Vitamin D intoxication
 Williams syndrome (increased sensitivity to vitamin D) 
 Sarcoidosis
 Kidney failure

References

Histopathology